The Central Coast Grammar School is an independent secular co-educational primary and secondary day school, located in Erina Heights on the Central Coast of New South Wales, Australia. The school provides a general education for approximately 1,250 students from Year K to Year 12; and is situated on a  campus.

History
The school was established in 1985, opening with 16 teachers and 185 students. It was the first school of its type on the Central Coast. It was expanded in the 1990s, incorporating buildings from the former Erina Hotel-Motel.

Headmasters 
The following individuals have served as Headmasters of Central Coast Grammar School:

Houses 
The five school houses are named after native Australian flora:
 Acacia (yellow)
 Banksia (orange)
 Grevillea (red)
 Ironbark (blue)
 Nicholii (green)

Notable alumni 
 Charlotte Bestactress and model
 Caitlin De WitAustralian wheelchair basketball player
 Matt Graham Olympic skier
 James Patterson  Paralympic skier
 Gordon Reid Politician

See also 

 List of non-government schools in New South Wales

References

External links 
 

Private primary schools in New South Wales
Private secondary schools in New South Wales
Educational institutions established in 1985
Junior School Heads Association of Australia Member Schools
Independent Schools Association (Australia)
1985 establishments in Australia
Grammar schools in Australia
Central Coast (New South Wales)